Josef Skořepa (born December 28, 1981) is a Czech professional ice hockey player currently playing for HC Dukla Jihlava in the Czech 1.liga. He played with HC Benátky nad Jizerou from 2004–2012, with three appearances for HC Bílí Tygři Liberec in the Czech Extraliga during the 2009–10 Czech Extraliga season.

References

External links

1981 births
BK Mladá Boleslav players
Czech ice hockey forwards
HC Benátky nad Jizerou players
HC Bílí Tygři Liberec players
HC Dukla Jihlava players
Living people
People from Nymburk
Sportspeople from the Central Bohemian Region